The Social Christian Conservative Party (PCSC) was a centre-right political party in Chile, founded in 1949 as the Conservative Party split in two factions. For electoral purposes, one of the factions was named the Social Christian Conservative Party (the other being called the Traditionalist Conservative Party). Some of the Social Christian Conservatives later returned to form in together with the 'Traditionals' the United Conservative Party (1953), whereas others participated in the Social Christian Federation with the National Falange from 1955 to 1957. In July 1957 the Social Christian Conservative Party merged with the Chilean National Falange to form the Christian Democratic Party of Chile.

Presidential candidates 
The following is a list of the presidential candidates supported by the Social Christian Conservative Party. (Information gathered from the Archive of Chilean Elections).

1952: Pedro Alfonso (lost)

Election results

Source: Cruz-Coke 1984

Bibliography
Cruz-Coke, Ricardo. 1984. Historia electoral de Chile. 1925-1973. Editorial Jurídica de Chile. Santiago
Pereira, Teresa. 1994. El Partido Conservador: 1930-1965, ideas, figuras y actitudes. Editorial Universitaria. Santiago de Chile.
Sanfuentes Carrión, Marcial. 1957. El Partido Conservador. Editorial Universitaria. Santiago

Christian democratic parties in South America
Conservative parties in Chile
1949 establishments in Chile
1957 disestablishments in Chile
Defunct political parties in Chile
Political parties established in 1948
Political parties disestablished in 1957